Ivo Malinov (born 29 January 1993) is a Bulgarian footballer, who plays as a defender.

References

External links
 

1993 births
Living people
Bulgarian footballers
First Professional Football League (Bulgaria) players
FC Botev Vratsa players
Neftochimic Burgas players
Bulgarian expatriate footballers
Bulgarian expatriate sportspeople in France
Expatriate footballers in France
Association football fullbacks